Operation Regenbogen  may refer to:

In 1942 Operation Regenbogen (Arctic) was an unsuccessful sortie  against Arctic convoy JW 51B,  which led to the Battle of the Barents Sea
In 1945 Operation Regenbogen (U-boat) was the codename for the plan by Admiral Karl Dönitz to scuttle Kriegsmarine warships, particularly U-boats, at the end of the war